Beersel Hills Observatory is an amateur astronomical observatory. Founded in April 1998, it is located near Beersel, Belgium. It is primarily dedicated to the study of variable stars and visual double stars, including Delta Scuti, eclipsing binaries, and visual double stars.

See also
 List of astronomical observatories

References

Astronomical observatories in Belgium
Buildings and structures in Flemish Brabant